Miranda Wang (born in 1994), is the cofounder of Novoloop (formerly BioCellection, Inc.), which is a company that aims to turn plastic waste into high-performance materials that can be used in a variety of products. Novoloop's process has the potential to greatly reduce the amount of plastic that enters landfills every year, as well as the amount of  that is emitted by commonly used methods of material production.

Early life and education 
Wang originally became interested in combating the issue of plastic waste from a high school field trip to Vancouver South Waste Transfer Station. Seeing the sheer volume of plastic waste that moved through the station inspired Wang to find a way to recycle such materials.

Wang and her cofounder, Jeanny Yao, attended Magee Secondary School in Vancouver, British Columbia when they entered the Sanofi Biogenius Canada Competition in 2012. This competition allowed them to work with the help of mentors, University of British Columbia professor Lindsay Eltis, Dr. Adam Crowe, and Dr. James Round, to discover bacteria in the Fraser River that could eat phthalates. They eventually pivoted away from using a biological approach to degrade plastics, but this initial work has been the catalyst of Novoloop's ongoing work to find scalable ways to recycle plastics.

Wang went on to attend the University of Pennsylvania, graduating in 2016 with a BA in molecular biology with a double minor in philosophy and engineering entrepreneurship. During her time at the university, Wang continued to work with Yao to build their company. They took part in, and won, numerous entrepreneurial competitions and programs at the school.

Novoloop 
Upon graduation, Wang has continued to build Novoloop. The company continues to work towards a scalable way to create a sustainable cycle for plastics. The company has developed a multistep process that transforms low density and high density polyethylene (LDPE and HDPE), which is commonly used in disposable packaging, into new and sustainable materials. The company's first material is a thermoplastic polyurethane (TPU), which has comparable performance to many commercial rubbers. In addition to saving the recycled plastic from landfills, the company's process also produces much less greenhouse gas emissions than the production of other materials.

Novoloop decided to focus on innovating ways of recycling polyethylene (PE) plastics because it noticed a lack of technologies on the market that clean these “dirty plastics”. Now that Novoloop has developed an economical way of recycling polyethylene (PE) plastics, it is hoping to build a fully commercial processing plant. Wang hopes that this plant would be able to recycle tens of thousands of tonnes of plastic a year. Wang hopes that Novoloop will go on to continue to scale and diversify its variety of high performance recycled products, in coming decades. To help the company scale, Novoloop has partnered with the cities of San José, along with GreenWaste Recovery.

Awards and recognition 
Wang and her company have won numerous awards since they have begun to develop innovative ways of upcycling plastic waste. Notably, Wang was a recipient of the UN Environment Programme's Young Champions of the Earth award. 
In 2019 Wang also won the Rolex Award for Enterprise, and Novoloop was awarded $25,000 as the runner-up in the Urban Resilience Challenge. Forbes magazine also recognized Wang and Yao in 2019, naming the pair to its 30 under 30 social entrepreneurs list.

References 

Manufacturing company founders
American women company founders
American company founders
Living people
1994 births
Nationality missing
Chief executives in the manufacturing industry
Women chief executives
Canadian people of Chinese descent
21st-century American women